The 1906 Vermont Green and Gold football team was an American football team that represented  the University of Vermont as an independent during the 1906 college football season. In their second year under head coach George B. Drake, the team compiled a 5–4 record.

Schedule

References

Vermont
Vermont Catamounts football seasons
Vermont Green and Gold football